Steuart may refer to:

People with the surname 
Adam Steuart (Stuart, Stewart) (1591–1645), Scottish philosopher and controversialist
Agnes Louisa Steuart (1879–1972), member of the New Zealand Legislative Council under her married name Weston
David Steuart (born 1916), Saskatchewan politician, cabinet minister and Senator
George H. Steuart (brigadier general) (1828–1903), American military officer
George H. Steuart (diplomat) (1907–1998), American diplomat and Foreign Service officer
George H. Steuart (militia general) (1790–1867), US general who fought during the War of 1812
George H. Steuart (politician) (1700–1784), Scottish physician, tobacco planter, and Loyalist politician in colonial Maryland
James Steuart (economist) (1712–1780), British economist
John Steuart Curry (1897–1946), American painter
Margaret Steuart Pollard (1903–1996), British scholar of Sanskrit, poet and bard of the Cornish language
Richard D. Steuart (1880–1951), American journalist in Baltimore, Maryland
Richard Sprigg Steuart (1797–1876), American physician in Maryland, pioneer of the treatment of mental illness
Robert Steuart (1806–1843) British Whig politician
Ronald Steuart (1898–1988), member of Australian Watercolour Institute
William Steuart (disambiguation), several people

People with the given name 
Steuart Bayley (1836–1925), British civil servant and Lieutenant-Governor of Bengal  1879–1882
Steuart Bedford (born 1939), British orchestral and opera conductor
Steuart Campbell (born 1937), British skeptic and investigative science writer
George Steuart Hume (1747–1787), Maryland physician and landowner who emigrated to Scotland before the American Revolutionary War
Steuart Pringle (1928–2013), British Commandant General Royal Marines, seriously injured by an IRA bomb
Steuart Smith, American guitarist and multi-instrumentalist, vocalist, writer, producer with American rock band the Eagles
Steuart Walton, American heir, attorney, businessman, philanthropist
Steuart Wilson (1889–1996), British tenor and arts administrator

Places 
Steuart Hall, mansion built in the late 18th century on the outskirts of Baltimore, Maryland
Steuart Blakemore Building, now part of the Mary Ball Washington Museum and Library in Lancaster, Virginia
Don Chee Way and Steuart station, light rail station in San Francisco, California

See also
Seton-Steuart baronets, later Seton-Steuart baronetcy, of Allanton in the County of Lanark, a title in the baronetage of the United Kingdom
Stewart (name)
 Stuart (name)
 Steward (surname)